The Battle of Ibiraocaí (Portuguese: Batalha de Ibiraocaí), (Spanish: Batalla de Ibirocay) was a battle fought between an army of the United Kingdom of Portugal, Brazil and the Algarves and the forces of José Gervasio Artigas commanded by José Antonio Berdún. The Luso-Brazilians were victorious.

References

Citations

Bibliography
 

Ibiraocai
Ibiraocai
Conflicts in 1816
1816 in Portugal
1816 in Brazil
1816 in Uruguay